Podutik (in older sources also Utik or Pod Utikom) is a former settlement in central Slovenia in the northwest part of the capital Ljubljana. It belongs to the Dravlje District of the City Municipality of Ljubljana. It is part of the traditional region of Upper Carniola and is now included with the rest of the municipality in the Central Slovenia Statistical Region.

Geography
Podutik lies south of Kamna Gorica and west of Koseze. It was originally a ribbon village along the road to Dobrova, but much housing has been built south of the old village center since 1967. Prevalnik Hill (elevation ) rises to the west, Strmica Hill to the north, and Lookout Peak (Stražni vrh) to the south. The former village included the hamlets of Grič and Na Opekarni (also known as Smodikovec). The soil is loamy and there are fields to the southwest.

Name
Podutik was attested in historical sources as Luttich in 1178, Weytichk in 1312, and Wittikh in 1421, among other spellings. In older modern sources, the names Utik and Pod Utikom are found. The name Podutik is a fused prepositional phrase that has lost case inflection, from pod 'below' + Utik, referring to Utik Hill (elevation ) to the southwest.

History
A brickworks was established in the hamlet of Na Opekarni (literally, 'at the brickworks') in 1961. Podutik was annexed by the City of Ljubljana in two stages, in 1974 and 1982, ending its existence as an independent settlement.

Church
The parish church in Podutik stands on the northeast end of the former village, north of Podutik Street (Podutiška cesta). It is dedicated to the Feast of Corpus Christi. Construction of the church started in 2000, and it was consecrated in 2005.

Notable people
Notable people that were born or lived in Podutik include:
Alojzij Vodnik (1868–1939), stone cutter
Anton Vodnik (1901–1965), poet
France Vodnik (1903–1986), poet, translator, and essayist

References

External links
Podutik on Geopedia

Localities of Ljubljana
Dravlje District